Vittangi SK is a sports club in Vittangi, Sweden, established in 1959.

The women's soccer team played in the Swedish top division in 1982.

References

External links
Vittangi SK 

Football clubs in Norrbotten County
Athletics clubs in Sweden
Gymnastics clubs
Sports clubs established in 1959
1959 establishments in Sweden
Ski clubs in Sweden